Ney Thol is a Cambodian judge and member of the Khmer Rouge Tribunal. Thol was director of the School for Military Officers before being appointed president of the Military Court of Cambodia since 1987.

References

Living people
Cambodian judges
Year of birth missing (living people)
Khmer Rouge Tribunal judges
Cambodian military personnel
Place of birth missing (living people)